Okenia angelica is a species of sea slug, specifically a dorid nudibranch, a marine gastropod mollusc in the family Goniodorididae.

Distribution
This species was described from Bahía de los Ángeles, Baja California with additional specimens from Isla Cedros on the Pacific Ocean coast of Baja California and Bahía de Banderas, Jalisco, Mexico.

Description
This Okenia has a broad body and seven to nine pairs of curved lateral papillae. The body is brown grading to purple with an opaque white patch covering most of the back. In front of the gills there are raised purple spots surrounded by orange-brown pigment within an area of pale brown. The papillae and rhinophores may be tipped with light orange pigment.

Ecology
The diet of this species is probably an encrusting bryozoan.

References

Goniodorididae
Gastropods described in 2004